Joof (English spelling in the Gambia) or Diouf (French spelling in Senegal and Mauritania) is a surname that is typically Serer. This surname is also spelt Juuf or Juf (in the Serer language).

Though there are multiple spellings for this surname, they all refer to the same people. The differences in spelling came about because Senegal was colonized by France, while the Gambia was colonized by the United Kingdom. Although spelt differently, they are pronounced the same way.

The totem and symbol of the Joof family is the antelope, the symbol of grace, royalty, wisdom, hard work and protection in Serer mythology. The name of their clan is "Njoofene" variations: "Njuufeen" or "Njufeen" (in Serer). Members of this family had ruled over many of the pre-colonial kingdoms of Senegambia, including the Kingdom of Sine, the Kingdom of Saloum and the Kingdom of Baol. The royal princesses (Lingeers) from the Joof family were also given in marriage to the pre-colonial kings and princes of Senegambia. Some of these included the kings of Jolof, kings of Waalo, kings of Cayor and Baol (after 1549 following the Battle of Danki). From these marriages, they provided many heirs to the thrones of these kingdoms. Although usually associated with Serer royalty, the Joof family also figure prominently in Serer religious affairs.

History of the Joof family

The Wagadou period

The Joof family is one of the old families of Senegambia. Serer oral tradition speaks of a noble called Lamane Jegan Joof, owner of a large herd of livestock and estate who was also a farmer. He migrated from Lambaye following an argument with his relative, the king of Lambaye. The dispute concerned the governance of Lambaye and over-taxation of his herd which he considered unjust. As such, he decided to head south and founded Tukar with his younger brother Ndik Joof. The tradition then went on to say that, he had a son called Sosseh Joof (Socé Diouf) who was the heir of Tukar. Some scholars have proposed that, Tukar (and many of its surrounding villages such as Njujuf, Sob, etc., which were founded by Lamane Jegan Joof making them part of his estate and colony) now a rather large village in present-day Senegal, is an ancient village and well before the Guelowar period (1335) and placed the foundation of these villages in the 11th century, if not earlier. The Joof family had ruled Tukar for many centuries, inherited from their ancestor Lamane Jegan Joof through the Serer Lamanic custom, a rather strict custom of Serer land law and inheritance. In 2004, Lamane Njaga Dibor Ndoffene Joof (Lamane Diaga Dibor Ndofene Diouf) was the last lamane of Tukar.

In the early history of the Ghana Empire to its end, the royal princesses of the Empire married into the Serer aristocratic families, some of these included Joof family. These royal princesses belonged to the maternal clan Wagadou (Bagadou in Serer language). With the Joof paternal clan, they ruled the Kingdom of Baol and provided many kings from the patrilineage Joof (the Joof paternal dynasty of Baol). Some of these kings include Boureh Joof (Bouré Diouf), Guidiane Joof (Guidiane Diouf), Ma Joof, Jinak Dialane [probably Gnilane] Joof, Maguinak Joof, etc. These kings preceded the Guelowar period by at least two or three centuries and long before the Fall paternal dynasty of Baol and Cayor who inherited the throne around 1549 after the Battle of Danki. The general consensus is that, after the demise of the Joof paternal and Wagadou maternal dynasties of Baol with other Serer paternal dynasties who jointly ruled Baol, the Fall paternal dynasty succeeded them, hence the first Damels and Teignes (titles of the kings of Cayor and Baol, respectively) from the Fall patrilineage were of Wagadou maternal descent. They simply married into the old royal family and succeeded to the throne.

The Guelowar period

The Guelowar period starts from 1350 during the reign of the first Guelowar king of Sine - Maad a Sinig Maysa Wali and ends in 1969 after the death of the last king of Sine and Saloum (Maad a Sinig Mahecor Joof and Maad Saloum Fode N'Gouye Joof respectively).

Maysa Wali and his family (the maternal clan Guelowar) fled Kaabu in 1335 following a dynastic struggle. They were defeated by the Ñaanco maternal dynasty of Kaabu (their extended relatives) and were granted asylum in the Kingdom of Sine by a Serer noble Council called The Great Council of Lamanes. Having served as legal advisor to this noble Council for 15 years, Maysa Wali managed to win the confidence and trust of the council and the common people. He was nominated and elected by the council and the people as king of Sine. He was the first Guelowar king of Sine. He gave his sisters in marriage to the Serer nobility  which sealed the union between Serer and Guelowar. It was the offspring of these marriages between the old Serer paternal noble clans and the Guelowar maternal clan of Kaabu that ruled the kingdom of Sine and later Saloum. In this Guelowar period, the Joof family (one of the oldest Serer paternal noble clans) provided many kings in the Kingdoms of Sine and Saloum (the Joof paternal dynasty of Sine and Saloum). The Joof family also founded three royal houses as follows (in the order of foundation) : 

The Royal House of Boureh Gnilane Joof (Serer: Mbind Bure Nilaan, other: Keur Bouré Gnilane)
The Royal House of Jogo Siga Joof (Serer: Mbind Jogo Siga, other : Keur Diogo Siga)
The Royal House of Semou Njekeh Joof (Serer: Mbind Sem-Jike, other: Keur Semou Djiké or Keur Semou Ndiké)

They all trace their descent to Maad Ndaah Njemeh Joof (also known as Bour Ndaah Ndiémé Diouf or Ndaah Njeeme Juuf) - the king of Laah (or Laa) in Baol, around the 13th century. Maad Ndaah Njemeh Joof was the father of Maad Niokhobai Joof (also king of Laa) who was the father of the Great Maad Patar Kolleh Joof (also: Bour or Buur Patar Kholé Diouf or Bour Patar Kholleh Diouf) - the conqueror of Baol. Maad Patar Kolleh Joof was the first of the Joof family to marry a Guelowar (Maad a Sinig Maysa Wali's niece). From that marriage he had Maad a Sinig Niokhobai Mane Nyan Joof (Niokhobaye Mane Niane Diouf) and Maad a Sinig Gejopal Mane Nyan Joof (Guédiopal Niane Mane Diouf), who were the first kings of Sine during the Guelowar period from the patrilineage Joof. Their brother Jaraff Boureh Gnilane Joof (Diaraf Bouré Gnilane Diouf) was not a king of Sine, but a Jaraff (equivalent of Prime Minister), who gave his name to the first Royal House of the Joof Dynasty (in the Guelowar period) and it is from that  "The Royal House of Boureh Gnilane Joof" derived from, which provided several kings in Sine and Saloum. The Joof Dynasty that succeeded to the throne of Saloum came from Sine.

Historic battles involving this family
This table lists some of the historic battles of Senegambia involving the kings or princes belonging to this family :

Genealogy
A short genealogy showing the descendants of Maad Ndaah Njemeh Joof.
Descendants of Maad Ndaah Njemeh Joof

                                                        Maad Ndaah Njemeh Joof
                                                     (king of Laa, Baol, c. 1290)
                                                                  │
                                                         Maad Niokhobai Joof
                                                         (king of Laa, Baol)
                                                                  │
                              │
                             │
          Maad Patar Kholleh Joof (The Conqueror)             =    ?    =              Lingeer Mane Nyan
          (king of Laa, Baol and Teigne of Baol)             │    (1)    │  (daughter of Sine o Mev Manneh (Guelowar)
                                                             │           │                    (2)
                                                             │           │_
                                                             │                                                        │
                                                Jaraff Boureh Gnilane Joof                                            │
                                               (Jaraff and prince of Sine)                                            │
                                                                                                                      │
                                             _│
                                             │
                                 ┌───────────┴────────────────────────────────────────┐
                                 │                         │                          │
              Maad a Sinig Niokhobai Mane Nyan Joof        │           Lingeer Siga Pal Mane Nyan Joof
                          (king of Sine)                   │
                                                           │
                                         Maad a Sinig Gejopal Mane Nyan Joof
                                                    (king of Sine)

Status in Serer religion

The Joof family figure prominently in Serer religion. Many of the Serer Pangool (saints and ancestral spirits) came from this family. Though associated with Serer royalty, this family's involvement in Serer religious affairs are found within the hermeneutics of Serer religion and traditions. Some of the sacred Serer sites regularly venerated were founded or headed by this family which underpins their involvement in the Pangool cult. Some of these venerated sites includes Tagdiam, residence of Maad Semou Njekeh Joof who is associated with the cult of Tagdiam; and Tukar, founded by Lamane Jegan Joof. In the Serer religious calendar, the Raan festival which takes place once a year after the new moon is held in Tukar.

Personalities with the surname Joof, Diouf, Juuf or Juf
The surname Joof, Diouf, Juuf or Juf is carried by several personalities, some of which include:

Royalty

Kingdom of Baol

 Lamane Jegan Joof, founder of Tukar in the medieval era (11th century)
 Maad Ndaah Njemeh Joof, king of Laa (Baol; c. 1290)
 Maad Patar Kholleh Joof (The Conqueror), king of Laa (Baol) and Teigne of Baol (c. 14th century)
 Teigne Jinaax Jalaan Joof (or Teeñ Jinaax Jalaan Juuf), King of Baol (Lambaye). Relative of Lamane Jegan Joof.

Kingdom of Sine

 Maad a Sinig Boukar Tjilas Sanghaie Joof, king of Sine (reigned 1724–35), son of Maad Semou Njekeh Joof
 Maad a Sinig Ama Joof Gnilane Faye Joof, king of Sine (reigned 1825–53)
 Lingeer Gnilane Jogoy Joof, wife of Maat Souka Ndela Joof (parents of Maad a Sinig Kumba Ndoffene Famak Joof)
 Maad a Sinig Kumba Ndoffene Famak Joof, king of Sine (reigned 1853–71)
 Maad a Sinig Semou Mak Joof, king of Sine (reigned 1878–82)
 Maad a Sinig Amadi Baro Joof, king of Sine (reigned 1882–84)
 Maad a Sinig Jaligui Sira Joof, king of Sine (reigned 1885–86)
 Maad a Sinig Niokhobai Joof, king of Sine (reigned 1886–87)
 Maad a Sinig Kumba Ndoffene Fa Ndeb Joof, king of Sine (reigned 1898–1924)
 Maad a Sinig Mahecor Joof, king of Sine (reigned 1924–69)
 Lamane Diaga Dibor Ndofene Diouf, lamane of Tukar, last Lamane of Tukar as of 2004.

Kingdom of Saloum

 Maad Saloum Semou Jimit Joof, king of Saloum (reigned 1898–1924)
 Maad Saloum Ndeneh Jogop Joof, king of Saloum (reigned 1901–11)
 Maad Saloum Semou N'Gouye Joof, king of Saloum (reigned 1911–13)
 Maat Saloum Gori Joof, king of Saloum (reigned 1913–19)
 Maad Saloum Mahawa Choro Joof, king of Saloum (reigned 1919–35)
 Maad Saloum Fode N'Gouye Joof, king of Saloum (reigned 1935–69)

Kingdom of Jolof

 Lingeer Penda Kumba Ngouille Joof, queen consort and queen mother of Jolof (wife of Bour ba Jolof Bakan Tam Boury Nabou Njie, king of Jolof, 1768–69)

Kingdom of Cayor

Manguinak Joof, appointed Ber Jak of Cayor (equivalent of Prime Minister) by his first cousin Damel Amari Ngoneh Sobell Fall after he assisted him defeat the king of Jolof at the Battle of Danki (1549).

Royal houses (Guelowar period)
 The Royal House of Boureh Gnilane Joof, the first royal house founded by the Joof family during the Guelowar period. Founded by Jaraff Boureh Gnilane Joof in the 14th century.
 The Royal House of Jogo Siga Joof, the second royal house founded by the Joof family. Founded by Maad a Sinig Jogo Gnilane Joof c. 16th century. Unlike the other two royal houses, this royal house did not provide many kings.
 The Royal House of Semou Njekeh Joof, the third and last royal house founded by the Joof family. This royal house was founded by Maad Semou Njekeh Joof in the 18th century.

Academic world
Ismaïla Diouf, professor of mathematics at the Université Cheikh Anta Diop (Dakar, Sénégal)
Mamadou Diouf, Senegalese historian, professor at the University of Michigan
Arona N'doffène Diouf, professor at the University of North Carolina
Sylviane Diouf, historian and author
Cheikh Diouf, historian and essayist
Marcel Mahawa Diouf, a Senegalese historian, theologian and author on Serer religion, traditions and history.
Babacar Sédikh Diouf, a Senegalese historian and author on Serer history
Moustapha Diouf, a Senegalese sociologist and professor at the University of Vermont

Politics

Ngalandou Diouf (1875–1941), Senegalese politician of the colonial era and parliamentarian of the French Chamber of Deputies
Abdou Diouf (born 1935), Senegalese politician, second president of Senegal and former Secretary-General of Francophonie.
Coumba Ndoffène Diouf, Senegalese politician who held several cabinet posts. Former Foreign Minister of Senegal, Minister of Public Health and Social Affairs.
George St. Clair Joof (1907–1955), Gambian politician and barrister
Lucretia St. Clair Joof (1913–1982), Gambian politician and the first woman in the House of Representatives (the Gambia)
 (1925–2006), Senegalese politician and engineer, who held several ministerial posts before and after Senegal's independence.
Jacques Diouf, Senegalese politician Director-General of The Food and Agriculture Organization of the United Nations (FAO)
 (born 1939) Senegalese politician and professor of literature at the Université Cheikh Anta Diop. Member and leader of the National Democratic Rally.
Mame Birame Souleymane Diouf (also Mame Biram Souleyman Diouf), Senegalese politician, economist and Deputy Mayor of Sokone (Senegal).<ref> Republique du Senegal, "Liste des candidats admis. p. 11]</ref>
Ibra Diouf, member of The Pan-African Parliament
Abdoulaye Diouf Sarr, minister in the Senegal government until 2022

Legal profession
Some of these legal professionals have ventured into politics but they are more known for their legal than for their political occupation :

Alhaji Bai Modi Joof (1933–1993) (Alhaji B.M. Joof), Gambian barrister, legal adviser to the Gambia Press Union and defender of free speech. Commonly known as Lawyer Joof (not to be confused with the younger Joseph Henry Joof, who is also known as Lawyer Joof), younger brother of Alhaji Alieu Ebrima Cham Joof.The Nation Newspaper (Gambia): "Champion of free speech (Tribute)", 7 June 1993, by William Ojo Dixon Colley (Managing Editor of The Nation Newspaper and Secretary General of the Gambia Press Union)
Joseph Henry Joof (born 1960), Gambian barrister, attorney general and politician.The Independent (Gambia): Attorney General Sacked

Medicine
Professor Boucar Diouf, member of the International Society of Nephrology, member of the African board of the Commission for the Global Advancement of Nephrology (COMGAN), member of the African Associations of Nephrology, President and founder-member of the Senegalese Society of Nephrology (SESONEPH)Monash university: "Human Nephron Number, Hypertension and Kidney Disease" 

Sports

Robert Diouf, professional Senegalese wrestler and former champion.
El Hadji Diouf (born 1981), Senegalese footballer, winner of many trophies as well as the 2002 BBC African Footballer of the Year award.
Dame Diouf, Senegalese footballer and elder brother of El Hadji Diouf.
Pa'Malick Joof (born 1985), Gambian footballer and former player of SV Wilhelmshaven.
Mamadou Diouf, Senegalese footballer who played for FC Metz.
El Hadji Diouf (footballer, born 1988) (not be confused with the other El Hadji Diouf), also a professional footballer.
Mamadou Diouf, professional basketball player and a member of the Senegalese national basketball team.
Pape Diouf (proper: Mababa Diouf, born 1951), former journalist and president of Olympique de Marseille (2005–2009) Article L'Equipe: Diouf et la France qui "exclut"
Mame Biram Diouf (born 1987), Senegalese footballer who plays for Turkish side Konyaspor.
Mame Tacko Diouf (born 1976), Senegalese 400 metres hurdler.
Mame Diodio Diouf (born 1984), Senegalese basketball player.
Valentina Diouf (born 1993), Italian volleyball player.
 (born 1994), German basketball player and journalist.
 Yehvann Diouf

Music and entertainment

Boucar Diouf, Senegalese humorist
, musician, percussionist and composer, band member of the Diouf Brothers (Les frères Diouf).Bibliography by Salsa Montreal
Pape Abdou Karim Diouf, brother of Élage Diouf and member of the Diouf Brothers band.
Mouss Diouf (born 1964), actor
Tamsier Joof, dancer, choreographer, radio personality and businessman 
Hella Joof, actress and director (of Gambian descent).
Mamadou Diouf, musician and songwriter

Visual arts
The definition of art is very broad.  This section list the names of visual artists (in its narrowest definition) who share this surname :

Cheikh Diouf, professional artist. His work is primarily based on African art, winner of many awards

Business and commerce
Abdoulie Joof, a Gambian tycoon, commonly known as Lie Joof, implicated in several controversies including the financing of a coup d'etat to overthrow president Yahya Jammeh.All Africa News: Gambia: Treason Trial Draws to an End As Lie Joof, Rambo Enter Defence

Multi-discipline
The following list gives the names of personalities with this surname who are experts in a variety of professions, and are equally known for each of these professions. Their professional life is so wide and varied that they can not be easily described by a single category :
Alhaji Alieu Ebrima Cham Joof (1924–2011), a Gambian Statesman, author, historian, politician, trade unionist, nationalist, broadcaster, etc.

Other
The Diouf brothers (Les frères Diouf), music band from Senegal. The band consists of Élage Diouf (El Hadji Fall Diouf) and Pape Abdou Karim Diouf.

See also

Faye family

References

Bibliography
Sarr, Alioune, Histoire du Sine-Saloum (Sénégal). Introduction, bibliographie et notes par Charles Becker. Version légèrement remaniée par rapport à celle qui est parue en 1986-87
Ndiaye Leyti, Oumar, Le Djoloff et ses Bourba (1966); Dakar: Nouvelles Editions africaines, 1981
Galvan, Dennis Charles. The State Must Be Our Master of Fire: How Peasants Craft Culturally Sustainable Development in Senegal. Berkeley: University of California Press (2004). 
Bressers, Hans &  Rosenbaum, Walter A. Achieving Sustainable Development: the challenge of governance across social scales. Greenwood Publishing Group (2003). 
Phillips, Lucie Colvin. Historical Dictionary of Senegal. Volume 23 of African historical dictionaries. Scarecrow Press (1981). 
Institut fondamental d'Afrique noire. Bulletin de L'Institut Fondamental D'Afrique Noire, Volume 38. IFAN, 1976
Thilmans, Guy, Descamps, Cyr & Camara, Abdoulaye, "Senegalia: études sur le patrimoine ouest-africain: hommage à Guy Thilmans." Sépia (2006). 
Klein, Martin A. Islam and Imperialism in Senegal Sine-Saloum, 1847-1914. Edinburgh University Press (1968)
Sheridan, Michael J. & Nyamweru, Celia. African Sacred Groves: ecological dynamics & social change. James Currey (2008). 
Ngom, Biram (comprising notes of Babacar Sédikh Diouf): La question Gelwaar et l’histoire du Siin. Dakar, Université de Dakar (1987)"l'epopee de Sanmoon Fay. "La famille Juuf." Ethiopiques n°54 revue semestrielle de culture négro-africaine Nouvelle série volume 7 2e semestre (1991)
Diouf, Niokhobaye. "Chronique du royaume du Sine." Suivie de notes sur les traditions orales et les sources écrites concernant le royaume du Sine par Charles Becker et Victor Martin (1972). Bulletin de l'Ifan, Tome 34, Série B, n° 4 (1972)
Faye, Louis Diène. Mort et naissance: le monde Sereer. Nouvelles Éditions africaines, 1983. 
Bâ, Abdou Bouri. "Essai sur l’histoire du Saloum et du Rip." Avant-propos par Charles Becker et Victor Martin
Sonko Godwin, Patience. Leaders of Senegambia Region, Reactions To European Infiltration 19th-20th Century. The Gambia: Sunrise Publishers Ltd (1995). 
Sonko Godwin, Patience. Ethnic Groups of The Senegambia Region, A Brief History. Third Edition. The Gambia: Sunrise Publishers Ltd (2003). 
Wade, Amadou. "Chronique du Walo sénégalais (1186-1855)", B. Cissé trans., V. Monteil, editor, Bulletin de l'IFAN, Series B, Vol. 26, no. 3/4 (1941, 1964)
Gastellu, Jean-Marc. L'égalitarisme économique des Serer du Sénégal. IRD Editions, 1981. 
Fall, Tanor Latsoukabé, Recueil sur la Vie des Damel. Introduit et commenté par C. Becker et V. Martin, BIFAN, Tome 36, Série B, n° 1, janvier 1974
Martin, Victor & Becker, Charles, "Lieux de culte et emplacements célèbres dans les pays sereer" (Sénégal),  Bulletin de l’Institut Fondamental d'Afrique Noire'', Tome 41, Série B, n° 1, janvier 1979, pp. 133–89 (pp. 15–34) [https://web.archive.org/web/20160303213621/http://ucadao.s3.amazonaws.com/agorae/2009311111736/V.Martin(a).pdf
Gravrand, Henry, "La Civilisation Sereer - Pangool", vol. 2, Les Nouvelles Editions Africaines du Senegal (1990). 

 
Serer royalty
Senegalese families
Gambian families
Senegambian families
Serer families
African royal families